is a former Japanese football player.

Playing career
Hoshi was born in Machida on December 10, 1980. He joined J1 League club Yokohama F. Marinos from youth team in 1999. However he could not play at all in the match. In 2000, he moved to FC Tokyo. However he could not play at all in the match. In August 2000, he moved to J2 League club Omiya Ardija on loan. Although he played several matches in 2000, he could not play at all in the match in 2001. In 2002, he returned to FC Tokyo. Although he played many matches as right midfielder in early 2002, he could hardly play in the match behind new member Naohiro Ishikawa in late 2002. In 2003, he moved to J2 club Montedio Yamagata. He became a regular player as right side midfielder. In 2005, he moved to Kyoto Purple Sanga (later Kyoto Sanga FC). He player as regular player in 2005. However his opportunity to play decreased for injury in 2006 and he could hardly play in the match behind new member Takaaki Tokushige in 2007. In 2008, he moved to Japan Football League (JFL) club Tochigi SC. Although the club was promoted to J2 from 2009, he could hardly play in the match in 2 seasons. In 2010, he moved to his local club FC Machida Zelvia in JFL. He played many matches in 2 seasons and the club was promoted to J2 from 2012 season. However he retired end of 2011 season.

Club statistics

References

External links

kyotosangadc

1980 births
Living people
Association football people from Tokyo
Japanese footballers
J1 League players
J2 League players
Japan Football League players
Yokohama F. Marinos players
FC Tokyo players
Omiya Ardija players
Montedio Yamagata players
Kyoto Sanga FC players
Tochigi SC players
FC Machida Zelvia players
Association football midfielders
Japanese sportsperson-politicians